Tippi Airport was an airport in Tippi, Ethiopia. Located at an elevation of 1240 meters above sea level, it had one unpaved runway 1302 meters long. As of 2014, the airport is no longer in use, and the runway serves other purposes.

References

Airports in Ethiopia
Southern Nations, Nationalities, and Peoples' Region